R.I.P. is the third studio album by British electronic musician Actress. It was released on 23 April 2012 on Honest Jon's Records.

Critical reception

R.I.P. holds a score of 81 out of 100 on the review aggregate website Metacritic based on reviews from 21 critics, indicating "universal acclaim". The album placed third in The Wires annual critics' poll.

Track listing

References 

2012 albums
Actress (musician) albums
Werk Discs albums